Hal Foss Peak is a  mountain summit located in the Olympic Mountains, in Jefferson County of Washington state. It is situated within Olympic National Park, and the Daniel J. Evans Wilderness. Precipitation runoff from the peak drains east to the Dungeness River via Heather Creek, and west into Deception Creek which is a tributary of the Dosewallips River. Topographic relief is significant as the summit rises 2,800 feet (853 m) above Heather Creek in approximately one mile.

Etymology
The mountain's name was officially adopted in 1977 by the United States Board on Geographic Names to honor Harold Alfred "Hal" Foss (1922–1974), the first Search and Rescue coordinator for the Washington State Department of Emergency Services. He was instrumental in forming the National Search and Rescue Coordinators Association, of which he was president. He was also president of the Mountain Rescue Association, chairman of the Washington Mountain Rescue Council, and member of the American Alpine Club. Foss died of a heart attack while climbing Mount St. Helens with his 18-year-old son Lynn on July 14, 1974.

Climate

Hal Foss Peak is located in the marine west coast climate zone of western North America. Most weather fronts originate in the Pacific Ocean, and travel east toward the Olympic Mountains. As fronts approach, they are forced upward by the peaks of the Olympic Range, causing them to drop their moisture in the form of rain or snowfall (Orographic lift). As a result, the Olympics experience high precipitation, especially during the winter months in the form of snowfall. During winter months, weather is usually cloudy, but due to high pressure systems over the Pacific Ocean that intensify during summer months, there is often little or no cloud cover during the summer. The months July through September offer the most favorable weather for climbing Hal Foss Peak.

Gallery

See also

 Olympic Mountains
 Geology of the Pacific Northwest

References

External links
 
 Weather: Hal Foss Peak
 Tribute to Hal Foss: Search and Rescue Magazine
 Hal Foss Peak photo: Flickr

Mountains of Washington (state)
Mountains of Jefferson County, Washington
Olympic Mountains
Landforms of Olympic National Park
North American 2000 m summits